Carlos Luna (born 25 January 1981) is a Venezuelan former volleyball player. He competed in the men's tournament at the 2008 Summer Olympics.

References

External links
 

1981 births
Living people
Venezuelan men's volleyball players
Olympic volleyball players of Venezuela
Volleyball players at the 2008 Summer Olympics
People from Zulia
20th-century Venezuelan people
21st-century Venezuelan people
Pan American Games medalists in volleyball
Pan American Games gold medalists for Venezuela
Medalists at the 2003 Pan American Games